State Road 254 (NM 254) is a  state highway in the US state of New Mexico. NM 254's northern terminus is at U.S. Route 380 (US 380) in Roswell, and the southern terminus is at NM 256 in Roswell.

Major intersections

See also

References

254
Transportation in Chaves County, New Mexico
Roswell, New Mexico